The 1st Parliament of Botswana, composed of 31 members of the National Assembly, met in Gaborone from September 1966, when Botswana gained independence from the United Kingdom, to 1969. Its membership was set by the 1965 Bechuanaland general election, which gave the Botswana Democratic Party control of Parliament with 28 members, while the Botswana People's Party received the remaining three seats.

List of members 
The following is a list of members of the 1st Parliament of Botswana:

The Cabinet

Parliamentary leadership

By constituency

See also 

 Elections in Botswana

References 

1966 establishments in Botswana
National Assembly (Botswana)